Dhoom is a 2004 Indian action thriller film.

Dhoom may also refer to:
Dhoom (film series), Indian action film series
Dhoom (Call album), 2011 rock album
Dhoom (Euphoria album), 1998 rock album

See also
Doom (disambiguation)